Miss Violence is a 2013 Greek psychological thriller film directed by Alexandros Avranas. The film was nominated upon its release for 8 Hellenic Film Academy Awards, winning 2: for Best Actor (Themis Panou) and Best Supporting Actress (Renni Pittaki). It also won the Aluminum Horse for Best Script at the Stockholm International Film Festival.

Plot 
On her eleventh birthday, Angeliki commits suicide by jumping off the balcony of her family's apartment. The incident thoroughly affects the family members, who inform the police to investigate the event. In response, the police suspiciously asks them whether Angeliki may had suffered a domestic trauma.

All the children behave uncomfortably when the patriarch is present, who
attempts to bring back normalcy to the family following the incident, but that normalcy seems to hide constant oppression of the children. One of the children, fourteen-year-old Myrto, tries to reach out to her teacher, but that doesn't lead anywhere. Instead, the patriarch forces all the daughters to dabble in prostitution.

The secrets behind Angeliki's suicide are gradually revealed. Angeliki ended her life because Myrto had told her that eleven is considered by their patriarch as the appropriate age to commence sexual violence towards her. This is what he did to her, and Eleni (their mother), all at the age of just eleven.

When the matriarch finds out the truth, she kills her husband. Eleni discovers the father's body the day after. She rejoices, since for her, her sister and children, this represents the end of their abuse. Once in the kitchen, however, she finds her mother, who orders her to lock the door, implying that the nightmare will continue.

Cast 
 Themis Panou as Father
 Reni Pittaki as Mother
 Eleni Roussinou as Eleni
 Sissy Toumasi as Myrto
 Rafika Chawishe as Civil status servant
 Christos Loulis

Reception 
Miss Violence entered the competition at the 70th Venice International Film Festival. Avranas won the Silver Lion for Best Director and actor Themis Panou won the Volpi Cup for Best Actor. It was also shown at the 2013 Toronto Film Festival. It is a Faliro House Productions and Plays2place Productions film.

Critical response 
The film received mostly positive reviews and was selected for the Fedeora prize for the best film from the Mediterranean region, while Greek director Alexandros Avranas was given the Silver Lion for Best Director for his work. On Rotten Tomatoes, Miss Violence holds an approval rating 81%, with an weighted average score of 6.10. The website hosts 21 international critic reviews.

References

External links
 Arca Cinema Giovani (Young Cinema Award) 
  
  
 Newspaper article and trailer, 6 September 2013 
 Naftemporiki
 E-go.gr

2013 films
Films about child abuse
Greek thriller drama films
Films shot in Athens